Edward Cullen Pollock (10 December 1913 – 8 February 1973) was an Australian rules footballer who played with Carlton in the Victorian Football League (VFL).

Pollock was the youngest ever player for the Carlton Football Club, making his debut as 19th man in round 6, 1930 at 16 years and 200 days old. This record was equalled by Jim Buckley in 1976.

Pollock struggled to establish himself in Carlton's side, never playing more than five successive games in his first four seasons, but he managed to play finals football in both 1935 and 1936. The next season was his last as a player. By his 24th birthday Pollock had played his final VFL game.

Notes

External links 

Ted Pollock's profile at Blueseum

1913 births
1973 deaths
Carlton Football Club players
Australian rules footballers from Melbourne
People from Brunswick, Victoria